This is a list of members of the European Parliament for Greece in the 1989 to 1994 session. See 1989 European Parliament election in Greece for the election results.

List

Footnotes

Greece
List
1989